Julio Ceaser Cortes (born August 13, 1962) is a former American football linebacker who played for the Seattle Seahawks of the National Football League (NFL). He played college football at University of Miami.

References 

1962 births
Living people
Players of American football from New York City
American football linebackers
Miami Hurricanes football players
Seattle Seahawks players